The 2014 Under 21 Women's Australian Championships was a women's Field Hockey tournament held in the Western Australia city of Perth.

New South Wales won the gold medal after defeating Queensland 3–1 in the final. Australian Capital Territory won the bronze medal by defeating South Australia 1–0 in the third and fourth playoff.

Competition format

The tournament is played in a round-robin format, with each team facing each other once. Final placings after the pool matches determine playoffs.

The bottom two teams play in a classification match, with the winner progressing to play the fifth placed team in the fifth and sixth place playoff, while the loser finishes in seventh place.

The top four teams contest the medal round. Two semi-finals are played, with the first placed team taking on the fourth placed team and the second placed team taking on the third placed team. The winners progress to the final, while the losers contest the third and fourth place playoff.

Teams

  Australian Capital Territory
  New South Wales
  Queensland
  South Australia
  Tasmania
  Victoria
  Western Australia

Results

Pool matches

Pool

Fifth to seventh place classification

Crossover Match

Fifth and sixth place

First to fourth place classification

Semi-finals

Third and fourth place

Final

Statistics

Final standings

External links

References

2014
2014 in Australian women's field hockey
Sports competitions in Perth, Western Australia